Dimitra Liani (born 30 April 1955) is a Greek former air hostess known for being the third wife and widow of Prime Minister of Greece Andreas Papandreou.

Early life, career and marriage
Born Dimitra Liani in 1955 in Elefsina, she comes from a well-connected family. Her father was a distinguished army officer, Colonel Constantine Lianis, while her cousin George Lianis was the member of parliament for her home town. She worked as an air hostess with Olympic Airways. She married Papandreou in 1989, becoming his official consort and head of his private office when he returned to power in 1993.

References

1955 births
Living people
Spouses of prime ministers of Greece
Greek socialites
Papandreou family
Flight attendants